Business News is an Australian business media organisation.

Business News may also refer to:

 Business journalism, journalism about business, economic and financial activities
 Business News Group, a Mexican publishing company 
 now Business News Channel, a TV news channel

See also

List of business newspapers
BNN Bloomberg, formerly Business News Network 
bne IntelliNews, formerly Business New Europe